Baptiste may refer to:

Baptiste (name), a list of people and fictional characters with the given name or surname
Baptiste, Centre, a commune of Haiti
Baptiste, Sud, a village in the Aquin commune of Haiti
Baptiste (TV series), a BBC TV series set in Amsterdam

See also

 
 
Jean-Baptiste
Batiste (disambiguation)
Baptist (disambiguation)